William Grove may refer to:
 William Grove (16th-century MP), MP for Shaftesbury
 William Barry Grove (1764–1818), U.S. Congressman from North Carolina
 William Bywater Grove (1848–1938), English botanist and microbiologist
 William Chaffin Grove, British Member of Parliament for Shaftesbury, 1768–1774, and Weymouth and Melcombe Regis, 1774–1781
 William Grove (1702–1767), British Member of Parliament for Coventry, 1741–1761
 William Remsburg Grove (1872–1952), American soldier and recipitent of the Medal of Honor
 William Robert Grove (1811–1896), Welsh judge and scientist; inter alia pioneer in fuel cells and concepts of conservation of energy.

See also
 William Groves (disambiguation)
 Williams Grove (disambiguation)